A starbase, in science fiction, is a facility in space.

Starbase or variation, may also refer to:

STARBASE, a math and science educational program for students
StarBase, a StarOffice database application
StarBase (biological database), an RNA database
Star Base Football Club, Ogudu, Lagos, Nigeria
Starbase 12, a starbase in the video game Star Trek: Bridge Commander
SpaceX Starbase, spaceport located at Boca Chica, Texas, United States
Starbase (video game), a space themed multiplayer video game
Starbase, a proprietary graphics API for HP-UX